Argyrotaenia atima is a species of moth of the family Tortricidae. It is found in Panama.

The wingspan is about 15 mm. The forewings are dark reddish fawn, changing to chestnut brown. The hindwings are bright ochreous, tinged with greyish towards the base.

References

Moths described in 1914
atima
Moths of Central America